Cornerstone Barristers is a set of barristers' chambers who specialise in planning, housing, licensing, local government and environmental law. Philip Coppel and Tom Cosgrove are joint Heads of Chambers. The set has about 60 barristers with offices in London, Birmingham and Cardiff, and it is regulated by the Bar Standards Board.

History
Cornerstone Barristers was formed in 1880 by Charles Hall, attorney-general to the Prince of Wales (later Edward VII). Graham Eyre was the Head of Chambers, before being succeeded by Anthony Scrivener in 1992.

In December 2011, 2–3 Gray's Inn Square was renamed to Cornerstone Barristers.

Notable cases
In 2005, the co-head of chambers Anthony Scrivener appeared before the House of Lords on behalf of air passengers claiming airlines had caused deep vein thrombosis.

Estelle Dehon represented Italian investigative journalist Stefania Maurizi in her attempt to access information about WikiLeaks editors under the Freedom of Information Act 2000.

Legal associations
Planning and Environment Bar Association (PEBA)
Honourable Society of the Inner Temple
National Infrastructure Planning Association (NIPA)
United Kingdom Environmental Law Association (UKELA)
Social Housing Law Association (SHLA)
Constitutional and Administrative Law Bar Association (ALBA)
Property Bar Association (PBA)
Chartered Institute of Housing (CIH)
Court of Protection Bar Association (CPBA)

References

Further reading

External links
 Official website

Barristers' chambers in the United Kingdom
Law firms based in London